Ernest Anderson III is a New York City based jazz guitarist and bassist. He has played with or done recordings with Rhys Chatham, is a frequent collaborator of Martin Bisi, and is currently a member of Marc Edwards Slipstream Time Travel.

References

Living people
Place of birth missing (living people)
Year of birth missing (living people)
Guitarists from New York City
American male guitarists